Occupation of Estonia may refer to:
 Occupation of Estonia by the German Empire (February–November 1918)
 Soviet occupation of Estonia (June 1940 – July 1941 and February 1944 – August 1991)
 German occupation of Estonia during World War II (July 1941 – September 1944)
 Soviet re-occupation of the Baltic states (1944), including Estonia

See also 
 Baltic states under Soviet rule (1944–1991)
 German occupation of the Baltic states during World War II
 Occupation of the Baltic states
 Soviet occupation of the Baltic states (1940)
 Vabamu Museum of Occupations and Freedom